The Lycée Saint-Louis-de-Gonzague (Franklin), founded in 1894, is a highly selective Roman Catholic, Jesuit school in the 16th arrondissement of Paris. It is regarded as the most prestigious French private school and has been ranked #1 lycée in France in the ranking of the newspaper Le Figaro.

History 
The “Petit Externat du Trocadéro” was inaugurated on September 28, 1894. The last Jesuit school established in the capital, it is the only one remaining after the closing of the colleges on Madrid and Vaugirard streets. It has enlarged little by little through real estate transactions in the immediate neighbourhood. At its inception in 1895 enrollment was 75 in classes 5 through 10. By 1898 enrollment was 220 pupils. Enrollment dropped due to the laws of 1901 but remained open without authorization. By 1920 enrollment reached 885 pupils. In 1920 an alumni association was formed. Anticlerical laws led to lawsuit payments that in 1923 almost led to the sale of Franklin.

On the initiative of its director, Fr. François Berlier de Vauplane, the Franklin Street campus was rebuilt between 1933 and 1935 by the architect Henry Violet. The vault contains a fresco representing the principal episodes in the life of St. Aloysius Gonzaga, the work of Henri de Maistre, prominent French painter of religious art. This contributed to its registration as a historic building in 1993. There are three recreation spaces on the roofs of the buildings, and a table tennis room and gymnasium in basement. 

During the Second World War manpower fluctuated and classes were held in the cellars at Franklin or Cup streets. In 1942, an elementary school was opened on Louis-David street.  By the end of the war in 1945, Franklin counted 1,100 students. Many new courses were added in 1950 and by 1956 the staff numbered about 100.  In 1968, Miss de Follin was named director of the elementary school. In 1969, a layperson was named prefect of the college and the number of Jesuits decreased. By 1978 there were 9 Jesuits and 86 lay teachers. In 1980 Franklin began admitting girls. First Lady Designate of France, Brigitte Macron, until recently, taught as a high-school teacher.

Organization 
The Jesuit school includes 
 an elementary school (école primaire) (3 to 10 years old) 
 a middle school (collège) with about 600 students (10 to 15 years old)
 a high school (lycée) with about 500 students (15 to 18 years old) 
 a classes préparatoires with about 160 students (18 to 20 years old) 
The elementary school is at 15, rue Louis David, while the middle school, high school, and preparatory classes are at 12, rue Benjamin Franklin. Both of these locations are in the 16th arrondissement of Paris.

Academic results 
Saint-Louis-de-Gonzague School is highly selective, for the academic elite, and always ranks among the top 3 high schools in France.

In 2012, the school ranked second nationwide with 64% of students receiving "Mention Très Bien" ("Highest Honors") at the Baccalaureat, the Lycée Henri-IV being ranked first.

In 2013, 76% of students received "Mention Très Bien" at the Baccalaureat, (compared to 59% at Lycée Henri-IV).

In 2016, achieved record number of 92% of the students received the "Mention Très Bien", which placed Saint-Louis-de-Gonzague as the best school in France.

Alumni 
Saint-Louis-de-Gonzague School has an impressive list of alumni including a number of French current and former Ministers, P.M., Senators, writers and Top French executives:

Politics
 Bruno Le Maire 
 Michel Poniatowski
 Luc Chatel
 Louis de Guiringaud
 Jean-François Deniau
 Xavier Deniau
 Henri Plagnol
 Georges Tron
 Xavier de La Chevalerie
 Seán MacBride
 
Business
 Baudouin Prot
 Charles-Édouard Bouée
 Bruno Lafont
 Xavier Fontanet
 Jacques-Antoine Granjon
 François Villeroy de Galhau 
 Édouard Tétreau
 Sindika Dokolo
Writers and Artists
 Michel Galabru
 Antoine de Margerie
 François Sureau
 Aliette de Bodard
 Bruno Latour
 
Religion
 Guy Thomazeau
 Charles Vandame
Sports
 Yves du Manoir
 Henry Chavancy
Military
 Honoré d'Estienne d'Orves
 Jacques Massu
Journalists
 Léa Salamé
 

The school alumni network is called the "Association des anciens élèves". and it counts more than 14.500 members.

Graduates' destinations 
The majority of students choose to pursue their studies in classes préparatoires such as Lycée Sainte-Geneviève, Collège Stanislas, or Lycée Janson-de-Sailly. They then usually move on to top French Grande École such as HEC Paris, ESSEC, ESCP (for business and management studies), or École Polytechnique, CentraleSupélec (for engineering and science studies). Franklin has also a high rate of admission to Sciences Po Paris, where students follow public policy and social science studies. Students who wish to study law are usually admitted to the Panthéon-Assas University, or for a medical degree they are admitted to the Université Paris Cité, both considered the best in France in their field. A few students also go to top international universities in Switzerland (EPFL), Italy (Bocconi), or England (Imperial College, UCL, KCL, LSE).

See also

 Catholic Church in France
 Education in France
 List of schools in France
 List of Jesuit schools

References 

Schools in Paris
Lycées in Paris
Jesuit secondary schools in France
Jesuit elementary and primary schools in France
Buildings and structures in the 16th arrondissement of Paris
1894 establishments in France
Educational institutions established in 1894